is a Japanese voice actor from Tokyo. He is affiliated with Haikyō. His popular roles include Omega Zero in Megaman Zero 3, Keigo Atobe in The Prince of Tennis, Victor Nikiforov in Yuri!!! on ICE, Grimmjow Jaegerjaquez in Bleach, Freed Justine in Fairy Tail, Yami Sukehiro in Black Clover, Ryomen Sukuna in Jujutsu Kaisen, Archer in Fate/stay night, Ren Jinguji in Uta no Prince-sama, Undertaker in Black Butler, Leone Abbacchio in JoJo's Bizarre Adventure: Golden Wind, Daiki Aomine in Kuroko's Basketball, Jurota Shishida and Shōta Aizawa in My Hero Academia,  Dandy in Space Dandy, Bercouli Synthesis One in Sword Art Online, Akira Hayama in Food Wars! Shokugeki no Soma and Dark Choco Cookie in Cookie Run: Kingdom.
He was nominated for a Best Singing Award at the 6th Seiyu Awards, and received a Best Supporting Actor award at the 7th Seiyu Awards. He has also provided dubbing for Korean actor Gong Yoo.

He is in a group called PHERO☆MEN (フェロ☆メン) with fellow voice actor Kohsuke Toriumi.

Health 
On January 22, 2022, Suwabe tested positive for COVID-19 Omicron variant, and had been experiencing "very mild" symptoms. A month later, it was announced that Suwabe had recovered and returned to work.

Filmography

Anime 
{| class="wikitable sortable plainrowheaders"
|+ List of voice performances in anime television series, videos, specials, and films
! Year !! Title !! Role !! class="unsortable"| Notes !! class="unsortable"| Source
|-
| –2000 || Great Teacher Onizuka || Koji Fujiyoshi || || 
|-
| || The Prince of Tennis || Keigo Atobe || || 
|-
| –02 || X/1999 || Fūma Monou || || 
|-
|  || E's Otherwise || Leonid || || 
|-
|  || Someday's Dreamers || Masami Oyamada || || 
|-
|  || Gad Guard || Katana || || 
|-
| –04 || Gilgamesh || Tria || || 
|-
| –04 || Peacemaker Kurogane || Toshimaro Yoshida || || 
|-
|  || Fullmetal Alchemist || Greed || || 
|-
|  || Tenjho Tenge || Dan Inosato || Ep. 22 || 
|-
|  || Burst Angel || Monitor Man B || || 
|-
|  || DearS || Hirofumi Nonaka || || 

|-
|  || Trinity Blood || Cain Nightroad || || 
|-
|  || Final Fantasy VII: Advent Children || Tseng ||  || 
|-
|  || Last Order: Final Fantasy VII || Tseng || || 
|-
| –09 || Shakugan no Shana || Friagne || Also movie || 
|-
| –06 || Blood+ || Van Argiano || || 
|-
| –06 || Chibi Vampire || Ren Maaka || || 
|-
| –06 || Keroro || Air Conditioner (Ep. 241) || || 
|-
| –present || Bleach|| Grimmjow Jaegerjaquez || also Thousand-Year Blood War in 2023 ||
|-
|  || Fate/stay night || Archer/Emiya || || 
|-
|  || Night Head Genesis || Mikumo || || 

|-
|  || Intrigue in the Bakumatsu – Irohanihoheto || Shiranui Kozo || || 
|-
| 
|| Gintama || GEOMON || || 
|-
|2006–07
|Nana
|Kyosuke Takakura
|
|

|-
| –08 || Dragonaut: The Resonance || Gio || || 

|-
|  || Nabari no Ou || Shimizu Raikou || || 
|-
|  || Vampire Knight || Akatsuki Kain || || 
|-
|  || Monochrome Factor || Shirogane || || 
|-
| –present || Natsume's Book of Friends || Seiji Matoba || || 
|-
|  || Black Butler || Undertaker || || 
|-
|  || Legends of the Dark King: A Fist of the North Star Story || Ryurou || || 
|-
|  || Pandora Hearts || Reim Lunettes || || 
|-
|  || 07-Ghost || Frau || || 
|-
|  || Fairy Tail || Freed Justine || ||
|-
|  || Fate/stay night: Unlimited Blade Works (film) || Archer || feature film || 
|-
|  || Princess Jellyfish || Shu Koibuchi || || 
|-
|  || The Tatami Galaxy || Masaki Jōgasaki || || 
|-
|  || The Legend of the Legendary Heroes || Miran Froaude || || 
|-
|-| –11 || Bakuman || Shinta Fukuda || || 
|-
| –12 || Tantei Opera Milky Holmes || Narrator, Holmes || || 

|-
|  || We Without Wings || Hayato Narita || || 
|-
|  || Deadman Wonderland || Tsunenaga Tamaki || || 
|-
| –12 || Mobile Suit Gundam AGE || Ract Elfamel || || 
|-
| –present || Uta no Prince-sama series || Ren Jinguji || || 
|-
|  || A Dark Rabbit Has Seven Lives || Kurosu Phillier Yuuchi || || 
|-
|  || Maji de Watashi ni Koi Shinasai! || Tadakatsu Minamoto || || 

|-
| –15 || High school DxD series || Sirzechs Lucifer || || 
|-
| || Medaka Box series || Kurokami Maguro || ||
|-
| –14 || Saint Seiya Omega || Orion Eden || || 
|-
| –17 || Kuroko's Basketball series || Daiki Aomine || 3 seasons and Last Game || 
|-
|  || Kids on the Slope || Junichi Katsuragi || || 
|-
|  || Chōyaku Hyakunin isshu: Uta Koi || Ariwara no Narihira || || 
|-
|  || Battle Spirits: Sword Eyes || Bullinger || ||  
|-
| –20 || Kingdom || Shou Hei Kun || || 
|-
| –15 || Kamisama Kiss || Kirihito / Akura-Ou || Also O || 

|-
| –13 || Blast of Tempest || Natsumura Kusaribe || || 
|-
|  || BlazBlue Alter Memory || Relius Clover || || 
|-
|  || Unlimited Psychic Squad || Andy Hinomiya || || 
|-
|  || Cuticle Detective Inaba || Hiroshi Inaba ||  || 
|-
|  || Devil Survivor 2 The Animation || Yamato Hotsuin || || 
|-
|  || One Piece || Vergo || || 
|- 
|  || The Eccentric Family || Yaichirō || || 
|-
|  || Brothers Conflict || Kaname Asahina || ||
|-
|  || Meganebu! || Yukiya Minabe || || 
|-
|  || Unbreakable Machine-Doll || Professor Percival || || 
|-
|  || Yowamushi Pedal || Toji Kanzaki || || 
|-
|  || Assassination Classroom || Tadaomi Karasuma || OVA ||
|-
|  || Space Dandy || Dandy || || 
|-
|  || Wizard Barristers: Benmashi Cecil|| Kiba Sameoka || || 
|-
|  || Natsume's Book of Friends: Sometime on a Snowy Day || Seiji Motoba || OVA || 
|-
|  || The Irregular at Magic High School|| Katsuto Jyumonji || || 
|-
|  || PriPara || Meganii Akai || || 
|-
|  || Barakamon || Takasei Kawafuji || || 
|-
|  || Black Butler: Book of Circus || Undertaker || TV series || 
|-
|  || New Initial D the Movie: Legend 1: Awakening || Takeshi Nakazato ||  || 
|-
|  || Fate/stay night: Unlimited Blade Works (TV) || Archer/Emiya || TV series || 
|-
|  || Amagi Brilliant Park || Takaya Kurisu || || 
|-
|  || Gundam Reconguista in G || Fukuchō, Jugan Meinstron, Medi Susun, Rosenthale Kobashi || || 
|-
|  || Akatsuki no Yona: Yona of the Dawn || Jae-Ha (Green dragon) || || 
|-
|  || Space Battleship Yamato 2199: Odyssey of the Celestial Ark || Fomuto Berger || film || 
|-
|  || Yurikuma Arashi || Life Sexy || || 
|-
|  || Gunslinger Stratos || Ricardo Martini || || 
|-
|  || JoJo's Bizarre Adventure: Stardust Crusaders || Telence T. D'Arby || || 
|-
|  || New Initial D the Movie: Legend 2: Racer || Takeshi Nakazato || || 
|-
|  || Gangsta. || Worick Arcangelo || || 
|-
|  || Sosei no Aquarion Love || Donar Dantes || OVA || 
|-
|  || Gate || Yōji Itami || || 
|-
|  || Wooser's Hand-to-Mouth Life: Phantasmagoric Arc || The Animal Whose Name Must Not be Spoken || || 
|-
|  || Food Wars: Shokugeki no Soma || Akira Hayama || || 
|-
|  || Fist of the North Star: Strawberry Flavor || Shū / Toki || || 
|-
|2015
|World Trigger
|Masataka Ninomiya
|
|
|-
| –17 || Star-Myu: High School Star Musical || Itsuki Ōtori || season 2 in 2017 || 
|-
|  || Fate/Grand Order -First Order- || Emiya ||  || 
|-
|  || Kiznaiver || Kazunao Yamada || || 
|-
|  || Prince of Stride: Alternative || Kyousuke Kuga || || 
|-
|  || Twin Star Exorcists || Seigen Amawaka || || 
|-
|  || The Morose Mononokean || Rippō || || 
|-
| –present || My Hero Academia || Shōta Aizawa, Jurota Shishida || || 
|-
|  || Servamp || World End || ||
|-
|  || Thunderbolt Fantasy || Shāng Bù Huàn || Puppet show || 
|-
|  || Danganronpa 3: The End of Hope's Peak High School || Juzo Sakakura || ||
|-
|  || Shokugeki no Souma: Ni no Sara || Akira Hayama || ||
|-
|  || Yuri!!! on Ice || Viktor Nikiforov / Makkachin || || 
|-
|  || Izetta: The Last Witch || Berckmann or Belkmann || ||
|-
|  || Bungo Stray Dogs || Sakunosuke Oda || ||
|-
|  || Interviews with Monster Girls || Takahashi Tetsuo || ||
|-
|  || ACCA: 13-Territory Inspection Dept. || Grossular || ||
|-
|  || The Eccentric Family 2 || Yaichirō || ||
|-
|  || Idol Time PriPara || Meganii Akai || Eps. 8 - || 
|-
|  || Black Butler: Book of the Atlantic || Undertaker || Movie ||
|-
|  || The Irregular at Magic High School: The Movie – The Girl Who Summons the Stars || Katsuto Jumonji || film ||
|-
|  || Godzilla: Planet of the Monsters || Mulu Elu Galu Gu || film ||
|-
|  || Nobunaga no Shinobi || Takigawa Kazumasu || ||
|-
|  || Fate/Apocrypha || Saber of Black/Siegfried||  || 
|-
| –21 || Restaurant to Another World || Master || || 
|-
|  || Saiyuki Reload Blast || Saitaisai || || 
|-
|  || Shōkoku no Altair || Abiriga || || 
|-
|  || Code:Realize ~Sousei no Himegimi~ || Abraham Van Helsing || || 
|-
|  || Dies Irae || Reinhard Heydrich || || 
|-
|  || The Ancient Magus' Bride || Seth Noel || || 
|-
|  || ClassicaLoid 2 || Antonín Dvořák/Hippo || || 
|-
| –21 ||Black Clover || Yami Sukehiro || ||
|-
| || Thunderbolt Fantasy: The Sword of Life and Death || Shāng Bù Huàn || Puppet show ||
|-
|  || Bungo Stray Dogs: Dead Apple || Sakunosuke Oda || film || 
|-
|  || Rokuhōdō Yotsuiro Biyori || Sui || ||  
|-
|  || Space Battleship Tiramisu || Vulgar Hummer || || 
|-
|  || Touken Ranbu: Hanamaru 2 || Sengo Muramasa || || 
|-
|  || Killing Bites || Narration || ||
|-
|  || Hakumei to Mikochi || Tsumujimaru || Episode. 8 ||
|-
|  || Batman Ninja || Deathstroke || || 
|-
|  || Legend of the Galactic Heroes: Die Neue These || Paul von Oberstein || ||  
|-
|  || Gundam Build Divers || Kotaro Ogami / Tigerwolf ||  ||
|-
| –19 || JoJo's Bizarre Adventure: Golden Wind || Leone Abbacchio || || 
|-
|  || Back Street Girls || Mandarin Kinoshita || ||
|-
|  || Lord of Vermilion: The Crimson King || Aoi Jun || || 
|-
| || The Seven Deadly Sins: Revival of the Commandments || Zhivago || Episode 9 (S2) ||
|-
|  || Thunderbolt Fantasy: Sword Travels in the East2 || Shāng Bù Huàn || Puppet show || 
|-
| || Sword Art Online: Alicization ||Integrity Knight Bercouli|| ||
|-
|  || Ace of Diamond Act II || Enjō Renji || || 
|-
|  || The Helpful Fox Senko-san || Kuroto Nakano || || 
|-
|  || Sarazanmai || Keppi || || 
|-
|  || Demon Slayer: Kimetsu no Yaiba || Kyogai || || 
|-
|  || Ensemble Stars! || Nagisa Ran || || 
|-
|  || BEM || Mr. Recycle || || 
|-
|  || Carole & Tuesday || Kyle || || 
|-
| –20 || No Guns Life || Juzo Inui || || 
|-
|  || Mairimashita! Iruma-kun || Baal || ||
|-
|  || Case File nº221: Kabukicho || Mrs. Hudson || || 
|-
|  || Levius || Zachs Cromwell || || 
|-
|  || Drifting Dragons || Gibbs || || 
|-
|  || Oda Cinnamon Nobunaga || Seira Honganji || || 
|-
|  || Smile Down the Runway || Hazime Yanagida || || 
|-
|  || Cagaster of an Insect Cage || Qasim || || 
|-
|  || Listeners || Denka || || 
|-
|| || Bungou to Alchemist: Shinpan no Haguruma || Akutagawa Ryuunosuke || || 
|-
| || Woodpecker Detective's Office || Mori Ōgai || || 
|-
| || Great Pretender || Laurent Thierry || || 
|-
| || The Misfit of Demon King Academy || Medoin Garsa || ||   
|-
| –21 || Jujutsu Kaisen || Ryoumen Sukuna / Double-Faced Spectre || ||
|-
|  || Ikebukuro West Gate Park || Zero-One || ||
|-
|  || Heaven's Design Team || Mizushima || || 
|-
|  || Dr. Ramune: Mysterious Disease Specialist || Momiji || || 
|-
|  || Kemono Jihen || Kohachi Inugami || ||
|-
|  || Re:Zero − Starting Life in Another World || Hector || || 
|-
|  || Thunderbolt Fantasy: Sword Seekers 3 || Shāng Bù Huàn || Puppet show ||
|-
|  || Farewell, My Dear Cramer || Gōro Fukatsu || || 
|-
|  || Mars Red || Yoshinobu Maeda || || 
|-
|  || Mobile Suit Gundam: Hathaway's Flash || Kenneth Sleg || Film ||  
|-
|  || Dragon Goes House-Hunting || Werepanther || || 
|-
|  || Record of Ragnarok || Hermes || || 
|-
|  || Kageki Shojo!! || Mamoru Ando || || 
|-
|  || Tesla Note || Mickey Miller || || 
|-
|  || The Night Beyond the Tricornered Window || Kazuomi Sakaki || || 
|-
| || Super Crooks || Josh (The Ghost) || || 
|-
| || Tribe Nine || Ōjirō Ōtori || || 
|-
| || Life with an Ordinary Guy Who Reincarnated into a Total Fantasy Knockout || Shen || || 
|-
| || Doraemon: Nobita's Little Star Wars 2021 || Dorakoruru || Film || 
|-
|  || Ensemble Stars!! Road to Show!! || Nagisa Ran || Film || 
|-
|  || Kotaro Lives Alone || Isamu Tamaru ||  || 
|-
|  || Ultraman Season 2 || Alien Pedanto ||  || 
|-
|  || Spy × Family || Shopkeeper ||  || 
|-
|  || Chimimo || Jigoku-san || || 
|-
| || The Prince of Tennis II: U-17 World Cup || Keigo Atobe || || 
|-
| || Uta no Prince-sama: Maji Love ST☆RISH Tours || Ren Jinguji || Film || 
|-
| || Tatami Time Machine Blues || Masaki Jōgasaki || || 
|-
|  || Bastard!! -Heavy Metal, Dark Fantasy- || Yngwie von Mattström  || Ep 24 ||
|-
| || My Master Has No Tail || Buncho Daikokutei || || 
|-
| || Blue Lock || Shouei Barou || || 
|-
| || Akiba Maid War || Suehiro || || 
|-
| || The Tale of the Outcasts || Naberius || || 
|-
| || Revenger || Sada the Pilgrim || || 
|-
| || Trigun Stampede || Brad || || 
|-
| || My Home Hero || Tetsuo Tosu || || 
|-
| || KamiKatsu || Bertrand || || 
|-
| || Why Raeliana Ended Up at the Duke's Mansion || Siatrich Newreal Chamos || || 
|-
| || Black Clover: Sword of the Wizard King || Yami Sukehiro || Film || 
|-
| || MF Ghost || Kaito Akaba || || 
|-
|}

Video games

Drama CDs

Live-Action Drama

Dubbing roles

Others
 Suwabe Junichi no Tobedase! Nomi Nakama Vol. 1 (2015) – reached number 41 on Oricon's list for Animation DVDs.
 Suwabe Junichi no Tobidase! Nomi Nakama Vol. 2 (2015) – reached number 71 on Oricon's list for Animation DVDs.
Kimi ka, kimi igai ka. Kimi he okuru Roland no kotoba audiobook version (scheduled for a November 14, 2022 release on Audible).

References

External links
 Official agency profile 

 Junichi Suwabe at Ryu's Seiyuu Info
 
 

1972 births
Living people
Japanese male pop singers
Japanese male video game actors
Japanese male voice actors
Male voice actors from Tokyo
Seiyu Award winners
Singers from Tokyo
21st-century Japanese singers
21st-century Japanese male singers
20th-century Japanese male actors
21st-century Japanese male actors
Tokyo Actor's Consumer's Cooperative Society voice actors